Comedy Showcase is a series of one-off comedy specials featuring some of Britain's fledgling comedy talent. Its format is reminiscent of the much earlier Comedy Playhouse. The format was replaced in 2012 by 4Funnies.

Series overview

Episodes

Series 1 (2007)

Series 2 (2009)

Series 3 (2011–2012)

References

External links

British Sitcom Guide

 
2000s British comedy television series
2010s British comedy television series
2007 British television series debuts
2012 British television series endings
Channel 4 sitcoms
Television pilot seasons
Television series by Big Talk Productions
Television series by ITV Studios
English-language television shows